That Phanom is a district (amphoe) in the southern part of Nakhon Phanom province, northeastern Thailand.

The district is named after Wat Phra That Phanom, the most important Buddhist temple in the region.

Geography
Neighboring districts are (from the south clockwise) Wan Yai, Mueang Mukdahan, Dong Luang of Mukdahan province, Na Kae, Renu Nakhon, and Mueang Nakhon Phanom of Nakhon Phanom Province. To the east across the Mekong River is the Laotian province Khammouan.
Elevation between 142 and 252 meters (830 feet).

History
In 1917, the district name was changed from Renu Nakhon (เรณูนคร) to That Phanom.

Administration
The district is divided into 12 sub-districts (tambons), which are further subdivided into 142 villages (mubans). The sub-district municipality (thesaban tambon) That Phanom covers parts of tambon That Phanom and That Phanom Nuea. There are a further 11 tambon administrative organizations (TAO).

Economy
The district's location on a bank of the Mekong has made it a prime agricultural area. Tomatoes, in particular, are one of the more profitable crops.

References

External links
amphoe.com (Thai)

That Phanom